Paul Jensen (born May 1, 1955) is an American former ice hockey defenseman.

Jensen competed in the men's tournament at the 1976 Winter Olympics for the United States. He played for the Michigan Tech Huskies. He was drafted 133rd overall by the Chicago Black Hawks in the 1975 NHL Amateur Draft and 175th overall by the Houston Aeros in the 1975 WHA Amateur Draft but never played professionally.

References

External links
 

1955 births
Living people
American men's ice hockey defensemen
Chicago Blackhawks draft picks
Houston Aeros draft picks
Ice hockey people from Minneapolis
Michigan Tech Huskies men's ice hockey players
Olympic ice hockey players of the United States
Ice hockey players at the 1976 Winter Olympics
NCAA men's ice hockey national champions